The ten cantons of the Federation of Bosnia and Herzegovina, one of the two political entities of Bosnia and Herzegovina, are its federal units with a high level of autonomy. The cantons were established by the Law on Federal Units (Cantons) on 12 June 1996 as a result of the Washington Agreement of 1994 between the representatives of the Bosnian Croats and Bosniaks.

Five of the cantons have a Bosniak majority: Una-Sana Canton, Tuzla Canton, Zenica-Doboj Canton, Bosnian-Podrinje Canton Goražde and Sarajevo Canton; three have a Croat majority: Posavina Canton, West Herzegovina Canton and Canton 10, and the two cantons are regarded as ethnically mixed: Central Bosnia Canton and Herzegovina-Neretva Canton. The most populous canton is Tuzla Canton, while Canton 10 is the largest by area.

Creation 

The cantons of the Federation of Bosnia and Herzegovina are a result of an artificial application of 1993 Vance–Owen Peace Plan for the war in Bosnia and Herzegovina, applied only to one part of Bosnia and Herzegovina. The plan originally foresaw the cantonization of the whole of Bosnia and Herzegovina.

The cantons were to be named after rivers and cities in the Federation of Bosnia and Herzegovina, based on the tradition from the Kingdom of Yugoslavia's naming of banates in 1929.

The ten cantons of the Federation of Bosnia and Herzegovina were created by the Law on Federal Units (Cantons), enacted by the Constituent Assembly of the Federation of Bosnia and Herzegovina on 12 June 1996. Of these, five have Bosniak and three Croat majorities, while two cantons are mixed. The cantons with Bosniak-majority are: Una-Sana Canton, Tuzla Canton, Zenica-Doboj Canton, Bosnian-Podrinje Canton Goražde and Sarajevo Canton, while the Croat-majority cantons are Posavina Canton, West Herzegovina Canton and Canton 10. The two mixed cantons are Central Bosnia Canton and Herzegovina-Neretva Canton.

Jurisdiction 

As the Federation of Bosnia and Herzegovina was created on the principle of decentralisation, the cantons have strong autonomy which is guaranteed by a long list of exclusive jurisdictions in the Constitution of the Federation of Bosnia and Herzegovina, including police, education, cultural policy, housing policy, public services, local economic policy, energy policy, media policy, welfare, tourism and the right of the cantons to introduce taxation and borrow money. Other jurisdictions are shared with the Federation of Bosnia and Herzegovina, including enforcement of human rights, health and environmental policy, infrastructure, social welfare, tourism and natural resources. Although in some areas the constitution foresaw a mixed jurisdiction between the Federation of Bosnia and Herzegovina and the cantons, such as tourism and energy policy, the cantons are the dominant actors. The principle of decentralisation is especially emphasised in the two mixed cantons, where the decisions regarding core issues, such as education, are left in the jurisdiction of the municipalities.

Governance 

The cantons consist of municipalities. A canton has its own government headed by a prime minister. The prime minister has his own cabinet, and is assisted in his duties by various cantonal ministries, agencies, and cantonal services. Five of the cantons (Una-Sana, Tuzla, Zenica-Doboj, Bosnian-Podrinje, and Sarajevo) have a Bosniak majority, three (Posavina, West Herzegovina and Canton 10) have a Bosnian Croat majority, while two of them (Central Bosnia and Herzegovina-Neretva) are "ethnically mixed", meaning neither ethnic group has a majority and there are special legislative procedures for the protection of their political interests.

See also
 Assemblies of the cantons of the Federation of Bosnia and Herzegovina
ISO 3166-2:BA

Footnotes

References

Books

Journals 

 

 
Subdivisions of Bosnia and Herzegovina
Bosnia and Herzegovina, Cantons
Bosnia and Herzegovina 2
Cantons, Bosnia and Herzegovina
Bosnia and Herzegovina geography-related lists